The Wassama Round House State Historic Park is in the Sierra Nevada foothills, in Madera County of central California.

Californian Native Americans
The park and Round House is used by local Native Americans as a ceremonial meeting place.  Gathering Day, held the third Saturday of October, includes demonstrations of dancing, crafts and basket weaving.

The Wassama Roundhouse is a reconstruction built in 1985 upon the location of four previous such houses. Originally dating prior to the 1860s, the roundhouses served as the focal point of spiritual and ceremonial life for many Native Californians. In 1903, the third roundhouse was built using portions of the center pole from the two earlier houses.  It is California Historical Landmark #1001.

Access
Wassama Round House State Historic Park is off California State Route 49, five miles northwest of Oakhurst, California. The park features special events and tours.

Proposed for closure
The park was one of the 48 California state parks proposed for closure in January 2008 by California's Governor Arnold Schwarzenegger as part of a deficit reduction program. The Wassama Round House State Historic Park remains open.

See also
Miwok
Mono people
Indigenous peoples of California

References

External links
Official Wassama Round House State Historic Park website

California State Historic Parks
Museums in Madera County, California
Native American history of California
Parks in Madera County, California
California Historical Landmarks
Protected areas of the Sierra Nevada (United States)